Shadia B. Drury  (born 1950) is a Canadian academic and political commentator. She is a professor emerita at the University of Regina. In 2005, she was elected a Fellow of the Royal Society of Canada.

Early life and education
Drury was born in Egypt but earned her Bachelor of Arts at Queen's University and her PhD from York University.

Career

Drury has taught Political Science and Philosophy at two western Canadian universities: first at the University of Calgary and at the University of Regina, where she holds the Canada Research Chair in Social Justice.

In 2005, she was elected a Fellow of the Royal Society of Canada. Two years later, she published "Aquinas and Modernity:  The Lost Promise of Natural Law" through the Cambridge University Press. She is also a columnist for Free Inquiry magazine.

Criticism
Several political philosophers consider Drury's attacks on Leo Strauss and his followers to be unfounded. In his 2009 book, Straussophobia: Defending Leo Strauss and Straussians against Shadia Drury and Other Accusers, Peter Minowitz argues that Drury’s work is “plagued by exaggerations, misquotations, contradictions, factual errors, and defective documentation.”

Bibliography
The Concept of Natural Law, Thesis (Ph.D.)--York University, 1978. Canadian Theses Division, National Library, Ottawa, Canadiana:  790230615
Law and Politics: Readings in Legal and Political Thought. Edited with introduction and essay by Shadia B. Drury; associate editor, Rainer Knopff. Calgary: Detselig, 1980. 
The Political Ideas of Leo Strauss, Revised Edition. New York: St. Martin's Press,(originally published in 1988) 2005.
Alexandre Kojève: The Roots of Postmodern Politics. Palgrave Macmillan. 1994. 
Leo Strauss and the American Right. Palgrave Macmillan. 1999. 
Terror and Civilization: Christianity, Politics, and the Western Psyche. Palgrave Macmillan, 2004 
Aquinas and Modernity: The Lost Promise of Natural Law. Rowman & Littlefield Publishers, Inc. 2008.

See also
Political philosophy
Straussian
Neoconservatism
Clash of Civilizations

References

External links
 Matthew Rothschild. Shadia Drury interview: Political Ideas of Leo Strauss, Progressive Radio, 2005.
 The New Machiavelli: Leo Strauss and the Politics of Fear, CBC, April 27, 2005.
 Shadia Drury. Leo Strauss and the Grand Inquisitor, Free Inquiry magazine, June 2004.
 Shadia Drury,  "Gurus of Endless War", New Humanist, May/June 2007

1950 births
Living people
Canadian political scientists
Canada Research Chairs
Canadian political philosophers
Canadian women philosophers
20th-century Canadian philosophers
21st-century Canadian philosophers
Fellows of the Royal Society of Canada
Women political scientists
20th-century Canadian women scientists
20th-century Canadian women writers